Metin Alakoç (born 26 May 1942) is a Turkish former wrestler, born in Ankara, who competed in the 1968 Summer Olympics and in the 1972 Summer Olympics.

References

External links
 

1942 births
Living people
Sportspeople from Ankara
Olympic wrestlers of Turkey
Wrestlers at the 1968 Summer Olympics
Wrestlers at the 1972 Summer Olympics
Turkish male sport wrestlers